Pragal is a former civil parish in the municipality of Almada, Lisbon metropolitan area, Portugal. In 2013, the parish merged into the new parish Almada, Cova da Piedade, Pragal e Cacilhas. The population in 2011 was 7,156, in an area of 2.27 km2.

Overlooking the Tagus river and the 25 de Abril Bridge, the famous Sanctuary of Christ the King is in Pragal.

References

Former parishes of Almada